Aïn Séfra (lit. yellow spring) is a municipality in Naâma Province, Algeria. It is the district seat of Aïn Séfra District and it has a population of 47,415, which gives it 11 seats in the PMA. Its postal code is 45200 and its municipal code is 4503. It is the second most populated municipality in the province after Mécheria.

History 
The Ksar of Aïn-Séfra was erected around the year 1586 by the children of Mohamed Benchaïb, known as Bou Dekhil, patron saint of the city, after the purchase of the land from local tribes against 1000 sheep, according to the tales of oral tradition.

French Period 
During the first French incursions in the middle of the 19th century, the majority of "Chorfa" families left the ksar as refugees, mainly to Tlemcen and Fez.

The modern city dates back to the French colonial era. Initially, in 1882, a strategic military garrison post consequent to the revolt of Sheikh Bouamama left their bastion of Figuig. French troops have instead established a military post at the site of Aïn-Séfra, to control "The Gateway to the Sahara". A railway reached Aïn-Séfra as early as 1887, and it extended to Bechar and Kenadsa in 1906, both for economic and strategic reasons.

During the colonial period, it was an important sub-prefecture and a military territory, but also a region of cultural, economic and political importance. The region where Aïn-Séfra is located was one of the bastions of the popular resistance against the French colonial conquest, south of Oran.

Climate
Aïn Séfra has a cold arid climate (Köppen BWk) with hot to sweltering summers and, owing to its elevation, cool to relatively cold winters, despite its location in the Sahara Desert. 

Snow has been recorded on rare occasions. It lightly snowed on 18 February 1979, for the first time in recorded history, and again in the winters of 2016/2017 and 2017/2018. An unusual blizzard hit the area on 20 January 2017, dumping snow in the municipality up to a meter thick in some places. This was the largest snowfall in residents' memories and caused travel disruptions due to iced roads.

Demographics

Customs

Traditional wedding custom 

Traditionally wedding parties took place over 7 days. Nowadays, weddings last a maximum of 3 days.

For the first lunch, the relatives are invited for a meal with "merga" (dish in sauce). Subsequently, a couscous is served to the guests for the following meals.

Throughout the wedding, the bride would not leave her new home. Once the marriage ceremony was over, she would take her bucket, go out to fill it at the source and bring it home. Meanwhile, the groom would buy fruit and vegetables at the market without bags or baskets. He would then carry them in his burnous and give them to the bride, who would then give them to the cooks.

See also

 Isabelle Eberhardt

References

Communes of Naâma Province
1881 establishments in Algeria
Algeria